Víctor Hugo Ayala Núñez (born 1 January 1988) is a Paraguayan footballer who plays as a midfielder for Sportivo Ameliano. He is renowned for his long shot capabilities.

International goals
As of match played 7 June 2016. Paraguay score listed first, score column indicates score after each Ayala goal.

Honours

Club Libertad
Division Profesional: 2010 (Clausura)

Lanús
Copa Sudamericana: 2013
Primera División: 2016

References

External links
 
 Víctor Ayala at Football-Lineups
 
 

1988 births
Living people
Paraguayan footballers
Paraguayan expatriate footballers
Paraguay international footballers
People from Cordillera Department
Association football midfielders
Club Rubio Ñu footballers
Club Libertad footballers
Al Nassr FC players
Barcelona S.C. footballers
Club de Gimnasia y Esgrima La Plata footballers
Club Sol de América footballers
Paraguayan Primera División players
Argentine Primera División players
Ecuadorian Serie A players
Copa América Centenario players
Saudi Professional League players
Paraguayan expatriate sportspeople in Argentina
Paraguayan expatriate sportspeople in Ecuador
Expatriate footballers in Argentina
Expatriate footballers in Saudi Arabia
Expatriate footballers in Ecuador